The  is the prefectural parliament of Saitama Prefecture.

Current composition 
As of 2021, the assembly was composed as follows:

Organisation

President and Vice-President

President: Takashi Kinoshita (LDP), elected from Sakado
Vice-President: Masaru Okachi (LDP), elected from Okegawa

References

Prefectural assemblies of Japan
Politics of Saitama Prefecture